The frange (Albanian) or franc (French) was the currency of the Republic of Korçë (also written "Koritza" on the currency) between 1917 and 1921. It was subdivided into 100 centimes. The currency was introduced during the period of French occupation. It was only issued in paper money form, with notes issued in denominations of 50 centimes, 1 and 5 frange. After the end of the French occupation, the frange was replaced by the skender in 1921.

References

Currencies of Albania
Currencies of Europe
Modern obsolete currencies 
1921 disestablishments
20th-century economic history
Modern history of Albania
Currencies introduced in 1917